Nicholas Andrew Saunders,  (born 26 June 1946) is an Australian academic who served as the Vice-Chancellor of the University of Newcastle from 2004 to 2011.

Early life
Saunders was born in Sydney, New South Wales, and attended Newington College (1959–1962), before graduating in medicine from the University of Sydney.

Medical and academic career

Saunders undertook his specialist physician training at Royal North Shore Hospital. In 1974 he spent two years as a Research Fellow at McMaster University Medical Centre in Canada, followed by two years as assistant professor of medicine at Harvard Medical School. He was a foundation member of the University of Newcastle Faculty of Medicine in 1978 and Professor of Medicine from 1983. 

Saunders practiced as a specialist in respiratory and sleep medicine at the Royal Newcastle Hospital and then the John Hunter Hospital from 1990 until 1992, where he was also Chair of the Department of Medicine. From Newcastle he went on to become the Head of the Faculty of Health Sciences and Dean of the School of Medicine at Flinders University, South Australia between 1993 and 1998. From 1998 to 2003 he was Dean of the Faculty of Medicine, Nursing and Health Sciences at Monash University, Victoria.

University leadership
Saunders commenced a five-year term as Vice-Chancellor and President of the University of Newcastle in 2004, following his long-standing association with the university and the Hunter River district. During his time at Newcastle, Saunders cut more than 400 positions—one job in five—to deal with the university's financial woes.

Appointments
Saunders has served on the following boards and councils:
 Chair – National Health and Medical Research Council
 Member – Higher Education Council
 Member – Prime Minister's Science Engineering and Innovation Council
 Member – Australian Research Council
 Member – Aboriginal and Torres Strait Islander Health Council
 Chair – Committee of Deans of Australian Medical Schools
 Member – Newington College Council

Honours
On 1 January 2001, Saunders was awarded the Centenary Medal for "outstanding leadership in medicine and education as Dean of Medicine, Monash University". On 11 June 2012, he was named an Officer of the Order of Australia for "distinguished service to medicine and to higher education through administration and clinical leadership roles, and as a significant contributor to national academic and professional organisations."

References

1946 births
Living people
People from Sydney
Australian pulmonologists
Academic staff of Flinders University
Harvard Medical School faculty
Sydney Medical School alumni
People educated at Newington College
Members of Newington College Council
Recipients of the Centenary Medal
Officers of the Order of Australia
Academic staff of the University of Newcastle (Australia)
Academic staff of Monash University